Peter Brian Gabriel (born 13 February 1950) is an English musician, singer, songwriter, record producer, and activist. He rose to fame as the original lead singer of the progressive rock band Genesis. After leaving Genesis in 1975, he launched a successful solo career with "Solsbury Hill" as his first single. His fifth studio album, So (1986), is his best-selling release and is certified triple platinum in the UK and five times platinum in the US. The album's most successful single, "Sledgehammer", won a record nine MTV Awards at the 1987 MTV Video Music Awards and, according to a report in 2011, it was MTV's most played music video of all time.

Gabriel has been a champion of world music for much of his career. He co-founded the WOMAD festival in 1982. He has continued to focus on producing and promoting world music through his Real World Records label. He has also pioneered digital distribution methods for music, co-founding OD2, one of the first online music download services. Gabriel has also been involved in numerous humanitarian efforts. In 1980, he released the anti-apartheid single "Biko". He has participated in several human-rights benefit concerts, including Amnesty International's Human Rights Now! tour in 1988, and co-founded the Witness human rights organisation in 1992. Gabriel developed The Elders with Richard Branson, which was launched by Nelson Mandela in 2007.

Gabriel has won three Brit Awards—winning Best British Male in 1987, six Grammy Awards, thirteen MTV Video Music Awards, the first Pioneer Award at the BT Digital Music Awards, the Q magazine Lifetime Achievement, the Ivor Novello Award for Lifetime Achievement, and the Polar Music Prize. He was made a BMI Icon at the 57th annual BMI London Awards for his "influence on generations of music makers". In recognition of his many years of human rights activism, he received the Man of Peace award from the Nobel Peace Prize laureates in 2006, and Time magazine named him one of the 100 most influential people in the world in 2008. AllMusic has described Gabriel as "one of rock's most ambitious, innovative musicians, as well as one of its most political". He was inducted into the Rock and Roll Hall of Fame as a member of Genesis in 2010, followed by his induction as a solo artist in 2014. In March 2015, he was awarded an honorary doctorate from the University of South Australia in recognition of his achievements in music.

Early life 
Peter Brian Gabriel was born on 13 February 1950 in Chobham, Surrey, England. He was raised in a middle-class family in Coxhill, a Victorian manor situated on Deep Pool Farm just outside Chobham. His father, Ralph Parton Gabriel (1912–2012), was an electrical engineer and his mother, Edith Irene Gabriel (née Allen), was from a musical family. His great-great-great-uncle, Sir Thomas Gabriel, 1st Baronet, was Lord Mayor of London from 1866 to 1877. Gabriel attended Cable House, a private primary school in Woking, Surrey, followed by St Andrews Preparatory School for Boys in Horsell, Surrey. During his time at the latter, his teachers noticed his singing talent, but he opted for piano lessons from his mother and developed an interest in drumming. At age 10, he purchased a floor tom-tom.

Gabriel remarked of his early influences, "Hymns played quite a large part. They were the closest I came to soul music before I discovered soul music. There are certain hymns that you can scream your lungs out on, and I used to love that. It was great when you used to get the old shivers down the back." At age 12, Gabriel wrote his first song, "Sammy the Slug". Around this time, an aunt gave him money for professional singing lessons, but he used it to buy the Beatles' debut studio album Please Please Me (1963). In September 1963, he started at Charterhouse, a public school in Godalming, Surrey. There, he was a drummer and vocalist for his first band: the trad jazz outfit the Milords (or M'Lords). This was followed by a holiday band called the Spoken Word.

In 1965, Gabriel formed Garden Wall with school friends Tony Banks on piano and Chris Stewart on drums. Banks had started at Charterhouse at the same time as Gabriel; the two were uninterested in school activities but bonded over music and started to write songs. At a final concert before they broke up, Gabriel, dressed in a kaftan and beads, showered the audience with petals he had picked from neighbouring gardens.

Career

1967–1975: Genesis 
In 1967, after Garden Wall had disbanded, Gabriel, Banks, and Stewart were invited by fellow pupils Anthony Phillips and Mike Rutherford to work on a demo tape of songs. Gabriel and Banks contributed "She Is Beautiful", the first song they wrote together. The tape was sent to former Charterhouse pupil turned musician Jonathan King, who was immediately enthusiastic largely due to Gabriel's vocals. He signed the group and suggested a band name of Gabriel's Angels, but it was unpopular with the other members. They settled on King's other suggestion, Genesis. After King suggested they stick to more straightforward pop, Gabriel and Banks wrote "The Silent Sun" as a pastiche of the Bee Gees, one of King's favourite bands. It became Genesis's first single, released in 1968. It was included on their debut studio album, From Genesis to Revelation (1968), which saw Gabriel play the flute.

After the commercial failure of From Genesis to Revelation, the band went their separate ways and Gabriel continued his studies at Charterhouse. In September 1969, Gabriel, Banks, Rutherford, and Phillips decided to drop their plans and make Genesis a full-time working band. In early 1970, Gabriel played the flute on Mona Bone Jakon (1970) by Cat Stevens. The second studio album by Genesis, Trespass (1970), marked Gabriel expanding his musical output with the accordion, tambourine, and bass drum, and incorporate his soul music influences. He wrote the lyrics to "The Knife" as a parody of a protest song. The album sold little and at one point, Gabriel secured a place at London School of Film Technique because Genesis "seemed to be dying." Genesis recruited guitarist Steve Hackett and drummer Phil Collins. Their next studio album, Nursery Cryme (1971), features Gabriel playing the oboe. Its opener, "The Musical Box", was their first song in which Gabriel incorporated a story and characters into the lyrics.

The shows featuring Foxtrot (1972) marked a key development in Gabriel's stage performance. He had started to recite stories to introduce numbers as a way to cover the silence between songs, while the band tuned their instruments, or while technical faults were being fixed. During a gig in Dublin in September 1972, he disappeared from the set during the instrumental section of "The Musical Box" and reappeared in his wife's red dress and a fox's head, mimicking the album's cover. He kept the idea to himself as he felt the band would have voted against it. Despite some initial doubts from his bandmates, the incident received front-page coverage in Melody Maker, giving them national exposure which allowed the group to double their performance fee. One of Gabriel's stories was printed on the liner notes of their live album, Genesis Live (1973). By late 1973, following the success of Selling England by the Pound (1973), which centred on English themes and literary and materialistic references, a typical Genesis show had Gabriel wear fluorescent make-up, a cape, and bat wings for "Watcher of the Skies", a helmet, chest plate, and a shield for "Dancing with the Moonlit Knight", various costumes for "Supper's Ready", and an old man mask for "The Musical Box".

The Lamb Lies Down on Broadway (1974) was Gabriel's final studio album with Genesis. He devised its story of the spiritual journey of Rael, a Puerto Rican youth living in New York City, and the bizarre incidents and characters he meets on the way. Tensions increased during this period as Gabriel wanted to write all of the lyrics himself, and split with the band after film director William Friedkin had invited him to work on a screenplay. The project dissolved, and Gabriel returned to work with Genesis. Matters were complicated further with the difficult birth of Gabriel's first daughter, resulting in periods of time away from the band. In the end, Gabriel was late to deliver the lyrics and relied on contributions from Banks and Rutherford. In the liner notes, Gabriel is credited with "experiments with foreign sounds". He had Brian Eno provide additional electronic effects.

During a stop in Cleveland, Ohio, early into the album's tour, Gabriel informed the band of his intention to leave at its conclusion. Music critics often focused their reviews on Gabriel's theatrics and took the band's musical performance as secondary, which irritated the rest of the band. The tour ended in May 1975, after which Gabriel wrote a piece for the press on 15 August, entitled "Out, Angels Out", about his departure, his disillusion with the business, and his desire to spend time with his family. The news stunned fans of the group and left commentators wondering if the band could survive without him. His exit resulted in drummer Phil Collins reluctantly taking over on lead vocals after 400 singers were fruitlessly auditioned.

1975–1985: Solo debut with Peter Gabriel studio albums 
Gabriel described his break from the music business as his "learning period", during which he took piano and music lessons. He had recorded demos by the end of 1975, the fruits of a period of writing around 20 songs with his friend Martin Hall. After preparing material for a studio album Gabriel recorded his solo debut, Peter Gabriel, in 1976 and 1977 in Toronto and London, with producer Bob Ezrin.

Gabriel did not title his first four studio albums. All were labelled Peter Gabriel, using the same typeface, with designs by Hipgnosis. "The idea is to do it like a magazine, which will only come out once a year," he remarked in 1978. "So it's the same title, the same lettering in the same place; only the photo is different." Each album has, however, been given a nickname by fans, usually relating to the album cover.

Peter Gabriel (a.k.a. Peter Gabriel 1: Car) was released in February 1977 and reached No. 7 in the UK and No. 38 in the US. Its lead single, "Solsbury Hill", is an autobiographical song about a spiritual experience on top of Solsbury Hill in Somerset. "It's about being prepared to lose what you have for what you might get ..." said Gabriel. "It's about letting go." Gabriel toured the album with an 80-date tour from March to November 1977 with a band that included guitarist Robert Fripp of King Crimson often playing off stage and introduced as "Dusty Rhodes".

In late 1977, Gabriel started recording the second Peter Gabriel studio album (a.k.a. Peter Gabriel 2: Scratch) in the Netherlands, with Fripp as producer. Its "Mother of Violence" was written by Gabriel and his first wife Jill. Released in June 1978, the album went to No. 10 in the UK and No. 45 in the US. Gabriel's tour for the album lasted from August to December 1978. On this tour, Gabriel and his band shaved their heads.

Gabriel recorded the third Peter Gabriel studio album (a.k.a. Peter Gabriel 3: Melt) in England in 1979. He had developed an interest in African music and drum machines and later hailed the record as his breakthrough. The album has been credited as the first to use gated reverb on the drums, creating a distinct sound. While recording drums on "Intruder", one of the tracks featuring Phil Collins, Gabriel had Collins play various rhythms without using cymbals for several minutes as a basis to develop the song further. Collins used the gated effect on his debut solo single "In the Air Tonight" which became a signature sound in the 1980s and beyond.

Atlantic Records – Gabriel's US distributor, which had released his first two studio albums – refused to put it out. "An American A&R person came over in the middle of recording and – other than attempting to make one track sound like the Doobie Brothers, which he failed considerably to do – he was convinced that the thing was much too [adopts American accent] 'esoteric, Peter'… He wasn't convinced then that they would want to do anything with it. And, sure enough, when it was sent over there, it was given the big elbow."

Gabriel signed a recording contract with Mercury Records. Released in May 1980, the album went to No. 1 in the UK for three weeks. In the US, it peaked at No. 22. The singles "Games Without Frontiers" went to No. 4 and "Biko" went to No. 36 in the UK. After a handful of shows in 1979, Gabriel toured the album from February to October 1980. The tour marked Gabriel's first instance of crowd surfing when he fell back into the audience in a crucifix position. The stunt became a staple of his live shows.

On Peter Gabriel four (a.k.a. Peter Gabriel 4: Security), Gabriel took on greater responsibility over the production than before. He recorded it in 1981 and 1982, solely on digital tape, with a mobile studio parked at his home, Ashcombe House, in Somerset. Gabriel utilized a Fairlight CMI digital sampling synthesizer and incorporated electronic instrumentation with sampling world beat percussion. "Over the course of the last two albums," he observed, "I've got back into a rhythm consciousness. And the writing – particularly with the invention of these drum machines – is fantastic. You can store in their memories rhythms that interest you and excite you. And then the groove will carry on without you, and the groove will be exactly what you want it to be, rather than what a drummer thinks is appropriate for what you're doing."

The fourth Peter Gabriel, released in September 1982, hit No. 6 in the UK and No. 28 in the US. The second single, "Shock the Monkey", became Gabriel's first top 40 hit in the US, reaching No. 29. To handle American distribution, Gabriel signed with Geffen Records, which – initially unbeknown to Gabriel – titled the album Security to differentiate it from the first three. Gabriel's 1982 tour lasted a year and became his first to make a profit. Recordings from the tour were released on Gabriel's debut live release, Plays Live (1983).

Gabriel produced versions of the third and fourth Peter Gabriel albums with German lyrics. The third consisted of the studio recordings, overdubbed with new vocals. The fourth was remixed, with several tracks extended or altered.

In 1983, Gabriel developed the soundtrack for Alan Parker's drama film Birdy (1984), co-produced with Daniel Lanois. This consisted of new material, without lyrics, as well as remixed instrumentals from his previous studio album.

1985–1997: So, Passion, and Us
After finishing the soundtrack to Birdy, Gabriel shifted his musical focus from rhythm and texture, as heard on Peter Gabriel four and Birdy, towards more straightforward songs. In 1985, he recorded his fifth studio album, So (also co-produced with Lanois). So was released in May 1986 and reached No. 1 in the UK and No. 2 in the US. It remains Gabriel's best selling album with over 5 million copies sold in the US alone. It produced three UK top 20 singles: "Sledgehammer", "Big Time", and "Don't Give Up", a duet with Kate Bush. The first went to No. 1 on the US Billboard Hot 100, Gabriel's only single of his career to do so. It knocked off "Invisible Touch" by Genesis, his former band, from the top spot, also their only US number one hit. In the UK, the single went to No. 4. In 1990, Rolling Stone ranked So at No. 14 on its list of "Top 100 Albums of the Eighties".

"Sledgehammer" was particularly successful, dealing with sex and sexual relations through lyrical innuendos. Its famed music video was a collaboration between director Stephen R. Johnson, Aardman Animations, and the Brothers Quay and won a record nine MTV Video Music Awards in 1987. In 1998, it was named MTV's number one animated video of all time. So earned Gabriel two wins at the 1987 Brit Awards for Best British Male Solo Artist and Best British Video (for "Sledgehammer"). He was nominated for four Grammy Awards: Best Male Rock Vocal Performance, Song of the Year, and Record of the Year for "Sledgehammer", and Album of the Year for So. Gabriel toured worldwide to support So with the This Way Up Tour, from November 1986 to October 1987.

In 1988, Gabriel became involved as composer for Martin Scorsese's film The Last Temptation of Christ (1988). Scorsese had contacted Gabriel about the project since 1983 and wished, according to Gabriel, to present "the struggle between the humanity and divinity of Christ in a powerful and original way". Gabriel used musicians from WOMAD to perform instrumental pieces with focus on rhythm and African, Middle Eastern, and European textures, using the National Sound Archive in London for additional inspiration. The initial plan had dedicated ten weeks for recording before it was cut to three, leaving Gabriel unable to finish all the pieces he originally wanted to record. When the film was finished, Gabriel worked on the soundtrack for an additional four months to develop more of his unfinished ideas. Its soundtrack was released as Passion in June 1989. It won Gabriel a Grammy Award for Best New Age Performance and a nomination for a Golden Globe for Best Original Score – Motion Picture. In 1990, Gabriel put out his first compilation album, Shaking the Tree: Sixteen Golden Greats, which sold 2 million copies in the US.

Up until 1989, Gabriel was managed by Gail Colson. From 1989 to 1992, Gabriel recorded his follow-up to So, titled Us. The album saw Gabriel address personal themes, including his failed first marriage, psychotherapy, and the growing distance between him and his eldest daughter at the time.

Gabriel's introspection within the context of the album Us can be seen in the first single release "Digging in the Dirt" directed by John Downer. Accompanied by a disturbing video featuring Gabriel covered in snails and various foliage, this song made reference to the psychotherapy which had taken up much of Gabriel's time since the previous studio album. Gabriel describes his struggle to get through to his daughter in "Come Talk to Me" directed by Matt Mahurin, which featured backing vocals by Sinéad O'Connor. O'Connor also lent vocals to "Blood of Eden", directed by Nichola Bruce and Michael Coulson, the third single to be released from the album, and once again dealing with relationship struggles, this time going right back to Adam's rib for inspiration. 

The album is one of Gabriel's most personal. It met with less success than So, reaching No. 2 in the album chart on both sides of the Atlantic, and making modest chart impact with the singles "Digging in the Dirt" and the funkier "Steam", which evoked memories of "Sledgehammer". Gabriel followed the release of the album with the Secret World Tour, first using touring keyboardist Joy Askew to sing O'Connor's part, then O'Connor herself for a few months. O'Connor quit the tour, and was replaced by Paula Cole, the latter appearing on the tour recordings: a double album Secret World Live, and a concert video also called Secret World Live, both released in 1994.

Gabriel employed an innovative approach in the marketing of the Us album. Not wishing to feature only images of himself, he asked artist filmmakers Nichola Bruce and Michael Coulson to co-ordinate a marketing campaign using contemporary artists. Artists such as Helen Chadwick, Rebecca Horn, Nils-Udo, Andy Goldsworthy, David Mach and Yayoi Kusama collaborated to create original artworks for each of the 11 songs on the multi-million-selling CD. Coulson and Bruce documented the process on Hi-8 video. Bruce left Real World and Coulson continued with the campaign, using the documentary background material as the basis for a promotional EPK, the long-form video All About Us and the interactive CD-ROM Xplora1: Peter Gabriel's Secret World.

Gabriel won three more Grammy Awards, all in the Music Video category. He won the Grammy Award for Best Short Form Music Video in 1993 and 1994 for the videos to "Digging in the Dirt" and "Steam" respectively. Gabriel also won the 1996 Grammy Award for Best Long Form Music Video for his Secret World Live video.

1997–2009: OVO and Up
In 1997, Gabriel was invited to participate in the direction and soundtrack of the Millennium Dome Show, a live multimedia performance staged in the Millennium Dome in London throughout 2000. Gabriel said the team were given free rein, which contributed to the various problems they encountered with it, such as a lack of proper budgeting. He also felt that management, while succeeding to get the building finished on time, failed to understand the artistic side of the show and its content. Gabriel's soundtrack was released as OVO in June 2000. The Story of OVO was released in the CD-booklet-shaped comic book which was part of the CD edition with the title "OVO The Millennium Show". The Genesis greatest hits album Turn It On Again: The Hits (1999) features Gabriel sharing vocals with Phil Collins on a new version of "The Carpet Crawlers" entitled "The Carpet Crawlers 1999", produced by Trevor Horn. He stuck with soundtrack work for his next project, scoring for the Australian film Rabbit-Proof Fence (2002) with worldbeat music. Released in June 2002, Long Walk Home: Music from the Rabbit-Proof Fence received a Golden Globe Award nomination for Best Original Score – Motion Picture.

Up, Gabriel's first full-length studio album in a decade, was released in September 2002. He started work on it in 1995 before production halted three years later to focus time on other projects and collaborations. Work resumed in 2000, by which time Gabriel had 130 potential songs for the album, and spent almost two years on it before management at Virgin Records pushed Gabriel to complete it. Up reached No. 9 in the US and No. 11 in the UK, and supported with a world tour with a band that included Gabriel's daughter Melanie on backing vocals. The tour was documented with two live DVDs: Growing Up Live (2003) and Still Growing Up: Live & Unwrapped (2005).

In 2004, Gabriel met with his former Genesis bandmates to discuss the possibility of staging The Lamb Lies Down on Broadway (1974) as a reunion tour. He ultimately dismissed the idea, paving the way for Banks, Rutherford, and Collins to organise the Turn It On Again: The Tour. Gabriel produced and performed at the Eden Project Live 8 concert in July 2005. He joined Cat Stevens on stage to perform "Wild World" during Nelson Mandela's 46664 concert. In 2005, FIFA asked Gabriel and Brian Eno to organise an opening ceremony for the 2006 FIFA World Cup in Germany, but FIFA cancelled the idea in January 2006. At the opening ceremony of the 2006 Winter Olympics in Turin, Gabriel performed John Lennon's "Imagine".

In November 2006, the Seventh World Summit of Nobel Peace Laureates in Rome presented Gabriel with the Man of Peace award. The award, presented by former General Secretary of the USSR and Nobel Peace Prize winner Mikhail Gorbachev and Walter Veltroni, Mayor of Rome, was an acknowledgement of Gabriel's extensive contribution and work on behalf of human rights and peace. The award was presented in the Giulio Cesare Hall of the Campidoglio in Rome. At the end of the year, he was awarded the Q magazine Lifetime Achievement Award, presented to him by American musician Moby. In an interview published in the magazine to accompany the award, Gabriel's contribution to music was described as "vast and enduring."

Gabriel took on a project with the BBC World Service's competition "The Next Big Thing" to find the world's best young band. Gabriel judged the final six young artists with William Orbit, Geoff Travis, and Angélique Kidjo.

In June 2008, Gabriel released Big Blue Ball, an album of various artists collaborating with each other at his Real World Studios across three summers in the 1990s. He planned its release in the US without assistance from a label; he raised £2 million towards the recording and distribution of the album with Ingenious Media with the worldwide release handled through Warner Bros. Records. Gabriel appeared on a nationwide tour for the album in 2009.

Gabriel was a judge for the 6th and 8th annual Independent Music Awards to support independent artists.

Gabriel contributed to the WALL-E soundtrack in 2008 with Thomas Newman, including the film's closing song, "Down to Earth", for which they received the Grammy Award for Best Song Written for a Motion Picture, Television or Other Visual Media. The song was also nominated for a Golden Globe Award for Best Original Song and an Academy Award for Best Original Song. In February 2009, Gabriel announced that he would not be performing on the 2008 Academy Awards telecast because producers of the show were limiting his performance of "Down to Earth" from WALL-E to 65 seconds. John Legend and the Soweto Gospel Choir performed the song in his stead.

Gabriel's 2009 tour appearances included Mexico, Argentina, Chile, Peru, and Venezuela. His first ever performance in Peru was held in Lima on 20 March 2009, during his second visit to the country. His concert in Mexico City, on 27 March 2009, attracted more than 38,000 fans.

On 25 July 2009, he played at WOMAD Charlton Park, his only European performance of the year, to promote Witness. The show included two tracks from the then-forthcoming Scratch My Back: Paul Simon's "The Boy in the Bubble" and the Magnetic Fields' "The Book of Love".

2009–2019: Scratch My Back, New Blood, Rated PG, Flotsam and Jetsam

In 2009, Gabriel recorded Scratch My Back, an album of cover songs by various artists including David Bowie, Lou Reed, Arcade Fire, Radiohead, Regina Spektor, and Neil Young. The original concept was for Gabriel to cover an artists' song if they, in turn, covered one of his for an album simultaneously released as I'll Scratch Yours, but several participants later declined or were late to deliver and it was placed on hold. Gabriel avoided using drums and guitar in favour of orchestral arrangements, and altered his usual songwriting method by finishing the vocals first and then the song, for which he collaborated with John Metcalfe. Released in February 2010, Scratch My Back reached No. 12 in the UK. Gabriel toured worldwide with the New Blood Tour from March 2010 to July 2012 with a 54-piece orchestra and his daughter Melanie and Norwegian singer-songwriter Ane Brun on backing vocals. The follow-up, And I'll Scratch Yours, was released in September 2013.

During the New Blood Tour, Gabriel decided to expand on the Scratch My Back concept and, with Metcalfe's assistance, re-record a collection of his own songs with an orchestra. The result, New Blood, was released in October 2011.

In September 2012, Gabriel kicked off his Back to Front Tour which featured So (1986) performed in its entirety with the original musicians who played on the album, to mark its 25th anniversary. When the opening leg finished a month later, Gabriel took one year off to travel the world with his children. The tour resumed with a European leg from September 2013 to December 2014.

In 2014, Gabriel was inducted into the Rock and Roll Hall of Fame as a solo artist by Coldplay frontman Chris Martin. They performed Gabriel's "Washing of the Water" together. Gabriel performed "Heroes" by David Bowie with an orchestra at a concert in Berlin to commemorate the 25th anniversary of the fall of the Berlin Wall in November 2014.

In 2016, he was featured on the song "A.I." by American pop rock band OneRepublic from their fourth studio album Oh My My.

In June 2016, Gabriel released the single "I'm Amazing". The song was written several years prior, in part as a tribute to boxer Muhammad Ali. That month, he embarked on a joint tour with Sting titled The Rock Paper Scissors North American Tour.

Gabriel re-emerged in 2019 with the release of Rated PG, a compilation of songs that were created for film soundtracks throughout his career. The song selection spans over 30 years and includes tracks that had never been released on an official Gabriel album previously, including "Down to Earth" (from WALL-E) and "That'll Do" (from Babe: Pig in the City), an Oscar-nominated collaboration with Randy Newman. Initially only released on vinyl for Record Store Day on 13 April, the album was eventually released on digital streaming services later that month. Later that same year, Gabriel issued another digital release on 13 September titled Flotsam and Jetsam, a collection of B-sides, remixes and rarities that span Gabriel's entire solo career from 1976 to 2016, including his first solo recording, a cover of the Beatles' song "Strawberry Fields Forever".

2022–present: i/o 
Since 2002, Gabriel has been continually working on what he has given the tentative title of i/o, his tenth studio album. It was originally set to be released 18 months after Up, but touring pushed the release far away. He did an interview with Rolling Stone in 2005 stating that he had 150 songs in various stages. From 2013 to 2016, he posted regularly on social media about recording the new album. In 2019, he spoke on BBC Radio 6 about how he had taken a hiatus from making music due to his wife being sick, but he had begun to return to it now that she had recovered. In 2021, he was interviewed multiple times about his new album, and revealed that he had been recording with Manu Katché, Tony Levin and David Rhodes on 17 new songs. He posted multiple photos to his Facebook and Instagram of these sessions. In June 2022, Katché told the French magazine L'Illustré that the album was nearly complete and would be released later that year, pending an official announcement.

In November 2022, Gabriel announced his upcoming "i/o The Tour" for the spring of 2023 across several European cities, with later dates to be confirmed for the North America leg of the tour for the late summer/fall of 2023. This announcement also confirmed the name of the upcoming album to be stylized as i/o. The first single from the album, "Panopticom", was released digitally on 6 January 2023. A new piece from the album will be released on the date of each full moon in 2023, as well as a different mix of the song on each new moon in 2023, starting with the Dark Side Mix of "Panopticom". On 5 February, Gabriel released "The Court", the second single from the album. On 7 March, Gabriel released the third song from i/o, "Playing for Time". A basic arrangement of the song (Gabriel and Levin only, no lyrics) had already opened the shows on the Back to Front Tour.

Artistry 
Stylistically, Gabriel's music has been alternately described by music writers as progressive rock, art rock, art pop, worldbeat, and progressive soul. According to Rolling Stone journalist Ryan Reed, Gabriel has developed in all as an "art-rock innovator, soul-pop craftsman, [and] 'world music' ambassador" over the course of his career, while music scholar Gregg Akkermann argues that, despite his progressive rock origins, he has "managed to attract fans from across the spectrum: prog rock, alternative rock, world beat, blue-eyed soul, dance music, the college crowd, the teens, Americans, and Europeans". More broadly, AllMusic's Stephen Thomas Erlewine says Gabriel emerged during the 1980s as "one of rock's most ambitious, innovative musicians", as well as "an international pop star".

Gabriel has worked with a relatively stable crew of musicians and recording engineers throughout his solo career. Bass and Stick player Tony Levin has performed on every Gabriel studio album and every live tour except for Scratch My Back (2010), the soundtracks Passion (1989) and Long Walk Home (2002), and the New Blood Tour. Guitarist David Rhodes has been Gabriel's guitarist of choice since 1979. Prior to So (1986), Jerry Marotta was Gabriel's preferred drummer, both in the studio and on the road. (For the So and Us albums and tours Marotta was replaced by Manu Katché, who was then replaced by Ged Lynch on parts of the Up album and all of the subsequent tour). Gabriel is known for choosing top-flight collaborators, from co-producers such as Ezrin, Fripp, Lillywhite, and Lanois to musicians such as Natalie Merchant, Elizabeth Fraser, L. Shankar, Trent Reznor, Youssou N'Dour, Larry Fast, Nusrat Fateh Ali Khan, Sinéad O'Connor, Kate Bush, Ane Brun, Paula Cole, John Giblin, Dave Gregory, Peter Hammill, Papa Wemba, Manu Katché, Bayete, Milton Nascimento, Phil Collins, Stewart Copeland and OneRepublic.

Over the years, Gabriel has collaborated with singer Kate Bush several times; Bush provided backing vocals for Gabriel's "Games Without Frontiers" and "No Self Control" in 1980, and female lead vocal for "Don't Give Up" (a Top 10 hit in the UK) in 1986, and Gabriel appeared on her television special. Their duet of Roy Harper's "Another Day" was discussed for release as a single, but never appeared.

He also collaborated with avant-garde artist Laurie Anderson on two versions of her composition "Excellent Birds" – one for her second album Mister Heartbreak (1984), and another version called "This is the Picture (Excellent Birds)", which appeared on cassette and CD versions of So.

Gabriel sang (along with Jim Kerr of Simple Minds) on "Everywhere I Go", from the Call's 1986 studio album, Reconciled. On Toni Childs' 1994 studio album, The Woman's Boat, Gabriel sang on the track, "I Met a Man".

In 1998, Gabriel appeared on the soundtrack of Babe: Pig in the City as the lead vocalist of the song "That'll Do", written by Randy Newman. The song was nominated for an Academy Award, and Gabriel and Newman performed it at the following year's Oscar telecast. He performed a similar soundtrack appearance for the 2004 film Shall We Dance?, singing a cover version of "The Book of Love" by the Magnetic Fields.

In 1987, Gabriel appeared on Robbie Robertson's self-titled solo studio album, singing on "Fallen Angel"; co-wrote two Tom Robinson singles; and appeared on Joni Mitchell's 1988 studio album Chalk Mark in a Rain Storm, on the opening track "My Secret Place".

In 2001, Gabriel contributed lead vocals to the song "When You're Falling" on Afro Celt Sound System's Volume 3: Further in Time. In the summer of 2003, Gabriel performed in Ohio with a guest performance by Uzbek singer Sevara Nazarkhan.

Gabriel collaborated on tracks with electronic musician BT, who also worked on the OVO soundtrack with him. The tracks were never released, as the computers they were contained on were stolen from BT's home in California. He also sang the lyrics for Deep Forest on their theme song for the movie Strange Days (1995). In addition, Gabriel has appeared on Angelique Kidjo's 2007 studio album Djin Djin, singing on the song "Salala".

Gabriel has recorded a cover of the Vampire Weekend single "Cape Cod Kwassa Kwassa" with Hot Chip, where his name is mentioned several times in the chorus. He substitutes the original line "But this feels so unnatural / Peter Gabriel too / This feels so unnatural/ Peter Gabriel too" with "It feels so unnatural / Peter Gabriel too / and it feels so unnatural / to sing your own name."

Gabriel collaborated with Arcade Fire on their 2022 studio album, We. He sang backing vocals on the track "Unconditional II (Race and Religion)".

WOMAD and other projects 
Gabriel's interest in world music was first apparent on his third solo studio album. According to Spencer Kornhaber in The Atlantic in 2019: "When Peter Gabriel moved toward 'world music' four decades ago, he not only evangelized sounds that were novel to Western pop. He also set a radio template: majestic, with flourishes meant to read as 'exotic,' and lyrics meant to change lives." This influence has increased over time, and he is the driving force behind the World of Music, Arts and Dance (WOMAD) movement. Gabriel said:

Gabriel created the Real World Studios and record label to facilitate the creation and distribution of such music by various artists, and he has worked to educate Western culture about such musicians as Yungchen Lhamo, Nusrat Fateh Ali Khan and Youssou N'dour.

He has a longstanding interest in human rights and launched Witness, a charity that trains human rights activists to use video and online technologies to expose human rights abuses. In 2006, his work with WITNESS and his long-standing support of peace and human rights causes was recognised by the Nobel Peace Prize Laureates with the Man of Peace award.

In the 1990s, with Steve Nelson of Brilliant Media and director Michael Coulson, he developed advanced multimedia CD-ROM-based entertainment projects, creating Xplora (the world's largest selling music CD-ROM), and subsequently the EVE CD-ROM. EVE was a music and art adventure game directed by Michael Coulson and co-produced by the Starwave Corporation in Seattle; it won the Milia d'Or award Grand Prize at the Cannes in 1996.

In 1990, Gabriel lent his backing vocals to Ugandan political exile Geoffrey Oryema's "Land of Anaka", appearing on Oryema's first studio album Exile, released on Gabriel's Real World label.

In 1994, Gabriel starred in Breck Eisner's short film Recon as a detective who enters the minds of murder victims to find their killer's identity.

Gabriel helped pioneer a new realm of musical interaction in 2001, visiting Georgia State University's Language Research Center to participate in keyboard jam sessions with bonobo apes from the Democratic Republic of the Congo. (This experience inspired the song "Animal Nation", which was performed on Gabriel's 2002 "Growing Up" tour and was featured on the Growing Up Live DVD and The Wild Thornberrys Movie soundtrack.) Gabriel's desire to bring attention to the intelligence of primates also took the form of ApeNet, a project that aimed to link great apes through the internet, enabling the first interspecies internet communication.

He was one of the founders of on Demand Distribution (OD2), one of the first online music download services. Prior to its closure in 2009, its technology had been used by over 100 music download sites including MSN Music UK, MyCokeMusic, Planet Internet (KPN), Wanadoo and CD WOW!. OD2 was bought by US company Loudeye in June 2004 and subsequently by Finnish mobile giant Nokia in October 2006 for $60 million.

Gabriel is co-founder (with Brian Eno) of a musicians union called Mudda, short for "magnificent union of digitally downloading artists."

In 2000, Gabriel collaborated with Zucchero, Anggun and others in a charity for kids with AIDS. Erick Benzi wrote words and music and Patrick Bruel, Stephan Eicher, Faudel, Lokua Kanza, Laam, Nourith, Axelle Red have accepted to sing it.

In 2003, Gabriel contributed a song for the video game Uru: Ages Beyond Myst. In 2004, Gabriel contributed another song ("Curtains") and contributed voice work on another game in the Myst franchise, Myst IV: Revelation.

In June 2005, Gabriel and broadcast industry entrepreneur David Engelke purchased Solid State Logic, a manufacturer of mixing consoles and digital audio workstations. In 2017, the company was sold to the Audiotonix Group.

In May 2008, Gabriel's Real World Studios, in partnership with Bowers & Wilkins, started the Bowers & Wilkins Music Club – later known as Society of Sound – a subscription-based music retail site. Albums are currently available in either Apple Lossless or FLAC format.

He is one of the founding supporters of the annual global event Asteroid Day.

Activist for humanitarian causes 
In 1986, he started what has become a longstanding association with Amnesty International, becoming a pioneering participant in all 28 of Amnesty's Human rights concerts – a series of music events and tours staged by the US Section of Amnesty International between 1986 and 1998. He performed during the six-concert A Conspiracy of Hope US tour in June 1986; the twenty-concert Human Rights Now! world tour in 1988; the Chile: Embrace of Hope Concert in 1990 and at The Paris Concert for Amnesty International in 1998. He also performed in Amnesty's Secret Policeman's Ball benefit shows in collaboration with other artists and friends such as Lou Reed, David Gilmour of Pink Floyd and Youssou N'Dour; Gabriel closed those concerts performing his anti-apartheid anthem "Biko".
He spoke of his support for Amnesty on NBC's Today Show in 1986.

Inspired by the social activism he encountered in his work with Amnesty, in 1992, Gabriel co-founded WITNESS, a non-profit organisation that equips, trains and supports locally based organisations worldwide to use video and the internet in human rights documentation and advocacy.

In 1995, Gabriel and Cape Verdean human rights activist Vera Duarte were awarded the North–South Prize in its inaugural year.

In the late 1990s, Gabriel and entrepreneur Richard Branson discussed with Nelson Mandela their idea of a small, dedicated group of leaders, working objectively and without any vested personal interest to solve difficult global conflicts.

On 18 July 2007, in Johannesburg, South Africa, Nelson Mandela announced the formation of a new group, The Elders, in a speech he delivered on the occasion of his 89th birthday. Kofi Annan serves as Chair of the Elders and Gro Harlem Brundtland as Deputy Chair. The other members of the group are Martti Ahtisaari, Ela Bhatt, Lakhdar Brahimi, Fernando Henrique Cardoso, Jimmy Carter, Hina Jilani, Graça Machel, Mary Robinson, and Ernesto Zedillo. Desmond Tutu is an Honorary Elder, as was Nelson Mandela. The Elders is independently funded by a group of donors, including Branson and Gabriel.

The Elders use their collective skills to catalyse peaceful resolutions to long-standing conflicts, articulate new approaches to global issues that are causing or may later cause immense human suffering, and share wisdom by helping to connect voices all over the world. They work together to consider carefully which specific issues to approach.

In November 2007, Gabriel's non-profit group WITNESS launched The Hub, a participatory media site for human rights.

In September 2008, Gabriel was named as the recipient of Amnesty International's 2008 Ambassador of Conscience Award. In the same month, he received Quadriga United We Care award of Werkstatt Deutschland along with Boris Tadić, Eckart Höfling and Wikipedia. The award was presented to him by Queen Silvia of Sweden.

In 2010, Gabriel lent his support to the campaign to release Sakineh Mohammadi Ashtiani, an Iranian Azeri woman who was sentenced to death by stoning after being convicted of committing adultery.

In December 2013, Gabriel posted a video message in tribute to the deceased former South African president and anti-apartheid leader Nelson Mandela. Gabriel was quoted:

Gabriel has criticised Air France for their continued transport of monkeys to laboratories. In a letter to the airline, Gabriel wrote that in laboratories, "primates are violently force-fed chemicals, inflicted with brain damage, crippled, addicted to cocaine or alcohol, deprived of food and water, or psychologically tormented and ultimately killed."

In March 2014, Gabriel publicly supported #withsyria, a campaign to rally support for victims of the Syrian Civil War.

In November 2014, Gabriel, along with Pussy Riot, and Iron & Wine supported Hong Kong protesters at Hong Kong's Lennon Wall in their efforts.

In March 2015, Gabriel was awarded an honorary doctorate by the University of South Australia in recognition of his commitment to creativity and its transformational power in building peace and understanding.

He composed the song "The Veil" for Oliver Stone's film Snowden (2016).

Politics 
Gabriel has been described as one of rock's most political musicians by AllMusic. In 1992, on the 20th anniversary of the Bloody Sunday tragedy, Gabriel joined several left-wing figures such as Peter Hain, Jeremy Corbyn, Tony Benn, Ken Loach, John Pilger, and Adrian Mitchell in voicing his support for a demonstration in London calling for British withdrawal from Northern Ireland.

At the 1997 general election, he declared his support for the Labour Party, which won that election by a landslide after 18 years out of power, led by Tony Blair. In 1998, he was named in a list of the biggest private financial donors to Labour. However, he subsequently distanced himself from the Labour government following Tony Blair's support for George W. Bush and Britain's involvement in the Iraq War, which he strongly opposed. Gabriel later explained his decision for funding Labour, saying, "after all those years of Thatcher, that was the only time I've put money into a political party because I wanted to help get rid of the Tory government of that time."

In 2005, Gabriel gave a Green Party of England and Wales general election candidate special permission to record a cover of his song "Don't Give Up" for his campaign. In 2010, The Guardian described Gabriel as "a staunch advocate of proportional representation." In 2013, he stated that he had become more interested in online petitioning organisations to effect change than traditional party politics.

In 2012, Gabriel condemned the use of his music by the American conservative talk radio personality Rush Limbaugh during a controversial segment in which Limbaugh vilified Georgetown University law student Sandra Fluke. A statement on behalf of Gabriel read: "Peter was appalled to learn that his music was linked to Rush Limbaugh's extraordinary attack on Sandra Fluke. It is obvious from anyone that knows Peter's work that he would never approve such a use. He has asked his representatives to make sure his music is withdrawn and especially from these unfair, aggressive and ignorant comments."

In 2016, Gabriel supported the UK's continued membership of the European Union in the referendum on the issue.

Gabriel has declared his support for the two-state solution to the Israeli–Palestinian conflict. In 2014, he contributed songs to a new compilation album to raise funds for humanitarian organisations aiding Palestinian Arabs in Gaza. Gabriel was quoted: "I am certain that Israelis and Palestinians will both benefit from a two-state solution based on the 1967 borders. We have watched Palestinians suffer for too long, especially in Gaza. I am not, and never was, anti-Israeli or anti-Semitic, but I oppose the policy of the Israeli government, oppose injustice and oppose the occupation ... I am proud to be one of the voices asking the Israeli government: 'Where is the two-state solution that you wanted so much?' and clearly say that enough is enough." In 2019, Gabriel was among 50 artists who urged the BBC to ask for the Eurovision Song Contest to be moved out of Israel, citing human rights concerns.

Gabriel has been in support of the Armenian genocide recognition. In October 2020, he posted a message on social media in support of Armenia and Artsakh in regards to the Nagorno-Karabakh war. He stated "The fighting that has now broken out between Azerbaijan and Armenia is really horrific and we need to lobby whoever we can to encourage a ceasefire, but hearing reports that President Erdoğan has now lined up 80,000 Turkish troops on the Armenian border is a terrifying prospect, full of the dark echoes of history."

In popular culture 
Gabriel's music featured prominently on the popular 1980s television show Miami Vice. The songs include "The Rhythm of the Heat" and "Biko" (from "Evan"), "Red Rain" (from "Stone's War"), "Mercy Street" (from "Killshot"), "Sledgehammer" (from "Better Living Through Chemistry"), "We Do What We're Told (Milgram's 37)" (from "Forgive Us Our Debts" and "Deliver Us from Evil"), and "Don't Give Up" (from "Redemption in Blood"). With seven songs used total, Gabriel had the most music featured by a solo artist in the series, and he is the only artist to have had a song used in four of Vice's five seasons. Five of the nine tracks on his most popular album So (1986) were used in the series.

"Games Without Frontiers", "Here Comes the Flood", "Lay Your Hands on Me" and "We Do What We're Told (Milgram's 37)" each appear in separate episodes of the FX channel spy drama The Americans.

Gabriel's cover of David Bowie's "Heroes" was featured in the fourth season finale of Big Love, as well as the first season and the ending scene of Stranger Things season 3 and the ending credits of Lone Survivor. The song also features in 'Children of Mars', a 2020 episode of the web series Star Trek: Short Treks.

Gabriel's cover of "My Body Is a Cage" (song by Canadian indie rock band Arcade Fire) was featured in the House episode "Out of the Chute", was part of the soundtrack for the video game Assassin's Creed III, appeared in the trailers for John Carter (2012) and Helstrom, was used as part of the Santa Clara Vanguard's winning show in 2018, plays a major role in the key scene of the second season of television series Dark, and was used in an intense scene of the series finale of television series Lucifer.

Gabriel's song "Intruder" was played over the end credits of episode 9 of season 2 of Netflix original series Mindhunter.

Gabriel's song "In Your Eyes" played during the boombox scene in the theatrical release of the 1989 movie Say Anything....

A series of spoof documentaries about the fictitious rock star Brian Pern were based loosely on Gabriel.

"Shock the Monkey" appears in the South Park episode: "Raisins". Bebe Stevens tells Stan Marsh: "If you really want a shot at getting her back. Stand outside her window, hold a boom box up over your head and play Peter Gabriel". It was played over the opening credits of 1987's "Project X," which starred Matthew Broderick as an Air Force malcontent who is assigned to work in a laboratory that teaches chimpanzees how to fly.

In 2021, Northern Irish post-punk band Invaderband released their second studio album entitled 'Peter Gabriel'. The sleeve was a painting of Gabriel by Luke Haines.

Personal life 
Gabriel has married twice and has four children. In 1971, at the age of 21, he married Jill Moore, daughter of Philip Moore, Baron Moore of Wolvercote. They had two daughters, Anna-Marie (born 1974) and Melanie (born 1976). Anna-Marie is a filmmaker who filmed and directed Gabriel's live DVDs Growing Up on Tour: A Family Portrait (2003) and Still Growing Up: Live & Unwrapped (2005). Melanie is a musician who has been a backing vocalist in her father's band in 2002–2011. Both daughters appear in the final sequence of the video for their father's song "Sledgehammer". 

Gabriel's marriage became increasingly strained, culminating in Moore's affair with David Lord, the co-producer of Gabriel's fourth studio album. It ended in a divorce in 1987, and Gabriel went through a period of depression and attended therapy sessions for six years. For a time after his divorce, Gabriel lived with American actress Rosanna Arquette. In 2021, Irish singer Sinéad O'Connor claimed that she maintained an on-and-off relationship with Gabriel in the wake of his divorce, and that her termination of it out of dissatisfaction towards a lack of commitment inspired her own single "Thank You for Hearing Me".

Gabriel married Meabh Flynn in 2002. They have two sons, born in 2001 and 2008.

He has resided in Wiltshire for many years and runs Real World Studios from Box, Wiltshire. He previously lived in the Woolley Valley near Bath, Somerset. In 2010, he joined a campaign to stop agricultural development in the valley, which had also inspired his first solo single, "Solsbury Hill", in 1977.

Discography 

Studio albums
Peter Gabriel (1977; known as Peter Gabriel 1 and Car)
Peter Gabriel (1978; known as Peter Gabriel 2 and Scratch)
Peter Gabriel (1980; known as Peter Gabriel 3 and Melt)
Peter Gabriel (1982; known as Peter Gabriel 4 and Security)
So (1986)
Us (1992)
Up (2002)
Scratch My Back (2010)
New Blood (2011)
i/o (2023)

Soundtracks
Birdy (1985) 
Passion (1989) 
OVO (2000)
Long Walk Home (2002)

Awards and nominations

See also 
List of ambient music artists
List of artists who reached number one in the United States
List of artists who reached number one on the U.S. Dance Club Songs chart
List of artists who reached number one on the U.S. Mainstream Rock chart
List of best-selling music artists
24997 Petergabriel

References

Citations

Works cited

External links 

 
 
 
 
 Peter Gabriel on the Music-Map

 
1950 births
Living people
20th-century English male singers
21st-century English male singers
Art pop musicians
Art rock musicians
Atco Records artists
Atlantic Records artists
Brit Award winners
Charisma Records artists
EMI Records artists
English baritones
English experimental musicians
English film score composers
English humanitarians
English male film score composers
English male singer-songwriters
English multi-instrumentalists
English philanthropists
English pop rock singers
English pop singers
English record producers
English rock flautists
English rock keyboardists
English rock singers
English comics writers
Geffen Records artists
Genesis (band) members
Grammy Award winners
Honorary Members of the Royal Academy of Music
Ivor Novello Award winners
Mercury Records artists
Musicians from Somerset
Musicians from Surrey
Musicians from Wiltshire
People educated at Charterhouse School
People from Bath, Somerset
People from Chobham, Surrey
People from Godalming
Progressive rock musicians
Real World Records artists
Republic Records artists
Sustainability advocates
Tambourine players
Virgin Records artists
Writers about activism and social change
20th-century flautists
21st-century flautists